The 2003 FIA Sportscar Championship Nogaro was the seventh and final race for the 2003 FIA Sportscar Championship season, as well as the final race for the FIA Sportscar Championship series overall.  It was held at Circuit Paul Armagnac and ran for two hours and thirty minutes. It took place on September 21, 2003.

This race also marked one of the smallest fields in FIA Sportscar history.

Official results
Class winners in bold.  Cars failing to complete 75% of winner's distance marked as Not Classified (NC).

Statistics
 Pole Position - #2 Racing for Holland - 1:23.235
 Fastest Lap - #2 Racing for Holland - 1:23.906
 Distance - 374.508 km
 Average Speed - 149.195 km/h

References 

FIA Sportscar
N
FIA Sportscar Championship Nogaro